The 2023 PDC World Darts Championship (known as the 2023 Cazoo World Darts Championship) was a professional darts event that took place at Alexandra Palace in London, England, from 15 December 2022 to 3 January 2023. It was the 30th World Darts Championship to be organised by the Professional Darts Corporation since it separated from the now-defunct British Darts Organisation.

Michael Smith defeated Michael van Gerwen 7–4 in the final, winning his first world title and reaching world number one on the PDC Order of Merit for the first time. Smith hit the only nine-dart finish of the tournament in the final, with the score at 1–0 in sets to van Gerwen and 1–1 in legs, when van Gerwen had thrown eight darts at trebles and missed a dart at double 12 for a nine-dart finish himself in the same leg. Broadcasters and commentators subsequently labeled the leg as the greatest in darting history.

Peter Wright was the defending champion, having defeated Smith in the previous year's final, but he lost 4–1 to Kim Huybrechts in the third round.

Steve Beaton made a record-extending 32nd consecutive World Championship appearance, but lost in the first round to Danny van Trijp, and Dutchman Raymond van Barneveld became the second player to make 30 World Championship appearances.

Overview

In January 2022, it was announced that online car retailer Cazoo would become the new title sponsor on a multi-year deal. The deal brought an end to 20 years of the tournament being sponsored by bookmakers, with Ladbrokes sponsoring the event from 2003 to 2014, before William Hill's sponsorship of the event began the following year. The deal was Cazoo's fifth title sponsorship within the PDC, following deals to secure the naming rights for the World Cup of Darts, the European Championship, the Grand Slam of Darts, and the Premier League Darts. Japanese company Toyo Tires also sponsored the event, with their logo being worn on the sleeves of all 96 players.

As part of a four-year contract extension signed in 2021, the event was staged at Alexandra Palace in London. The same venue has been used since the 2008 championship. The dartboard used for the event was the Winmau Blade 6 Triple Core, used for the first time at a PDC World Championship following the end of the PDC's 25-year partnership with manufacturer Unicorn in January 2022.

Dutchman Michael van Gerwen went into the event widely seen as the favourite to lift his fourth championship, with Sky Sports pundits Wayne Mardle and Mark Webster both backing him, while rival Gerwyn Price of Wales declared him as "the one to beat". Van Gerwen himself said that he had nothing to prove, but warned his rivals that "there is only more to come", but acknowledged that as he was a favourite he was a "big target". Ladbrokes, who returned to sponsoring the event as an "official betting partner", gave odds of 13/5 for Van Gerwen.

Wright's own preparations received a setback in November when his wife was rushed to hospital during the Grand Slam, following which he pulled out of the Players Championship Finals, but he told Oche magazine that he would return in time to defend his championship.

Prize money
The prize money for the tournament remained at £2.5 million in total for the fifth year in a row, with the winner's share totalling £500,000. Additionally, a special jackpot of £100,000 was created by tournament sponsors Selco in the event a player hit two nine-dart finishes, with the player receiving £50,000 and the remainder split between Cancer Research UK and a member of the public chosen at random. Gerwyn Price described it as a "great initiative", particularly amid the cost of living crisis in the United Kingdom. In addition, the winner of the tournament receives the Sid Waddell Trophy, named after the former commentator who died in 2012.

Format
All matches were played as single in, double out – requiring the players to score 501 points to win a leg, finishing on either a double or the bullseye. Matches were played in set format, with each set being the best of five legs (first to three).

For all rounds except the first, the deciding set has to be won by two clear legs, unless the set score goes to 5–5, in which case a sudden-death leg will be played, with no throw for the bull in any sudden-death legs.

Qualification
96 players competed in the championship, with the thirty-two highest ranked players on the PDC Order of Merit being seeded to the second round, and the next thirty-two highest ranked players from the 2022 PDC Pro Tour Order of Merit and thirty-two players from the various qualifiers going into the first round.

Seeds

2021 winner Gerwyn Price was top of the two-year PDC Order of Merit and number one seed going into the tournament. Reigning champion from 2022 Peter Wright, who was also champion in 2020, was second seed and Michael van Gerwen, the three-time World Champion from 2014, 2017 and 2019, was third seed; having in 2022 won four major titles; the Premier League, the World Matchplay, the World Grand Prix and the Players Championship Finals. As well as Price, Wright and Van Gerwen, three other previous PDC world champions qualified as seeds; 2018 champion Rob Cross was the 6th seed, and 2015 and 2016 champion Gary Anderson was 11th seeded. 2007 champion Raymond van Barneveld was the 32nd and final seed, qualifying for his 30th world championship and becoming only the second player to do. 2014 BDO World Champion Stephen Bunting qualified as 21st seed as one of two BDO champions to qualify as seeds, alongside four-time BDO champion Van Barneveld.

The top seeds behind Price, Wright and Van Gerwen were 2022 Grand Slam of Darts champion Michael Smith, four-time 2022 European Tour event winner Luke Humphries, Cross, Jonny Clayton, and James Wade. Other 2022 major event champions to qualify as seeds were the 9th seeded UK Open champion Dutchman Danny Noppert, Masters champion Joe Cullen at 13th seed, European Champion Ross Smith in 19th with Damon Heta, one half of the victorious Australian World Cup team, one place below him in 20th.

Pro Tour qualification
Northern Irish newcomer Josh Rock, an event winner on the 2022 PDC Pro Tour and 2022 World Youth Champion, was the highest-ranked non-seed on the 2022 PDC Pro Tour Order of Merit in his debut year. 2011 and 2012 champion Adrian Lewis was a qualifier via the Pro Tour. 1996 BDO champion Steve Beaton also qualified, extending his record to 32 consecutive World Championship appearances.

As well as Rock, other players making their debuts were Martin Lukeman, Scott Williams, Danny Jansen, Cameron Menzies, John O'Shea and Adam Gawlas. Other players qualifying via the Pro Tour included Heta's World Cup of Darts teammate Simon Whitlock.

International qualifiers
The final group of 32 qualifiers were determined by a series of international qualifiers and secondary tours. The PDC Development and Challenge Tours, having been split into UK and EU sections in 2021, were restored as unified tours, with the top two from each tour qualifiying. A new Asian Championship was held for the first time, with the four semi-finalists from that event qualifiying for the World Championship. The Euro-Asian Darts Corporation qualifier, which was predominately contested by players from Russia and Belarus, was cancelled after both countries were suspended in the wake of the 2022 Russian invasion of Ukraine. In its place, a special qualifier was held for Ukrainian players only, with Vladyslav Omelchenko becoming the first Ukrainian player to qualify for the World Championship. The North American Championship was held for the first time since 2019, having been cancelled the previous two years due to COVID-19 restrictions. Qualification events were additionally held for Eastern Europe, Western Europe, South-West Europe, Germany, Australia, New Zealand, Central/Southern America, Japan, China & India, as well as top players from the Nordic & Baltic tour and the North American Championship Darts Circuit qualifying. 

Four-time BDO Women's World Champion Lisa Ashton and inaugural WDF Women's World Champion Beau Greaves qualified via the PDC Women's Tour. The first Women's World Matchplay, held in July 2022, was retrospectively declared to carry a World Championship spot in November, granting qualification to Fallon Sherrock, the only woman to have previously won a match at the event. 2022 World Seniors Darts Masters champion David Cameron was another qualifier, having been the highest ranked Canadian player on the Championship Darts Circuit. The final three places were awarded by a qualifier for non-qualified PDC Tour Card holders, with 1995 BDO World Champion Richie Burnett qualifying for the first time since 2014, and Ryan Joyce and Canadian Jeff Smith also returning to the World Championship.

Debutants via the international and invitation qualifiers were Sebastian Białecki (Poland), David Cameron (Canada), Mal Cuming (Australia), Leonard Gates (United States), Beau Greaves (England), Xicheng Han (China), Prakash Jiwa (India), Paolo Nebrida (Philippines), Vladyslav Omelchenko (Ukraine), Robert Owen (Wales), Nathan Rafferty (Northern Ireland), Grant Sampson (South Africa), Danny van Trijp (Netherlands), and Nobuhiro Yamamoto (Japan).

List of qualifiers

Order of Meritsecond round (seeded)
  (quarter-finals)
  (third round)
  (runner-up)
  (champion)
  (fourth round)
  (fourth round)
  (quarter-finals)
  (second round)
  (third round)
  (third round)
  (third round)
  (third round)
  (fourth round)
  (fourth round)
  (semi-finals)
  (third round)
  (fourth round)
  (third round)
  (third round)
  (third round)
  (quarter-finals)
  (quarter-finals)
  (second round)
  (second round)
  (semi-finals)
  (third round)
  (third round)
  (third round)
  (third round)
  (third round)
  (fourth round)
  (third round)

Pro Tour Order of Meritfirst round
  (fourth round)
  (second round)
  (second round)
  (second round)
  (second round)
  (first round)
  (second round)
  (third round)
  (second round)
  (second round)
  (first round)
  (first round)
  (second round)
  (first round)
  (first round)
  (second round)
  (fourth round)
  (second round)
  (first round)
  (first round)
  (second round)
  (second round)
  (first round)
  (second round)
  (second round)
  (second round)
  (second round)
  (first round)
  (first round)
  (second round)
  (first round)
  (second round)

International qualifiersfirst round
  – PDC Women's Series (first round)
  – CDC Tour US Player (second round)
  – East Europe Qualifier (first round)
  – PDC Tour Card Holder Qualifier (first round)
  – CDC Tour Canadian Player (second round)
  – DPA Oceanic Masters (first round)
  – North American Championship (second round)
  – PDC Women's Series (first round)
  – PDC China Premier League (first round)
  – German Super League (second round)
  – West Europe Qualifier (second round)
  – Asian Championship (second round)
  – Indian Qualifier (first round) 
  – PDC Tour Card Holder Qualifier (first round)
  – South-West Europe Qualifier (first round)
  – PDC Nordic & Baltic (second round)
  – PDC Nordic & Baltic (first round)
  – Asian Championship (first round)
  – Ukrainian Qualifier (first round)
  – PDC Challenge Tour (first round)
  – Asian Championship (first round)
  – Central/South America Qualifier (first round)
  – PDC Development Tour (second round)
  – DPNZ Qualifier (first round)
  – African Qualifier (second round)
  – Women's World Matchplay (first round)
  – PDC Tour Card Holder Qualifier (first round)
  – DPA Satellite Tour (first round)
  – Asian Championship (first round)
  – PDC Challenge Tour (second round)
  – PDC Development Tour (second round)
  – PDJ Championship (first round)

Summary

Opening rounds

The opening rounds were noted for the unusually low number of unseeded players to make it to the third round, with only three seeds losing, the lowest since the increase to 32 seeded players at the 2006 championship. World number eight James Wade was the highest profile casualty, losing 3–2 to Jim Williams. The other seeds to lose were 23rd seed Callan Rydz, who lost to Josh Rock, and 24th seed Daryl Gurney losing to Alan Soutar, both players by 3–0.

Further seeds passed without much difficulty, with Dirk van Duijvenbode's victory over Karel Sedláček being the only match to go to extra legs, and only a further three games going to the final set. The highest average of the first two rounds was thrown by Ryan Joyce, who was defeated by Scott Williams 3–1 in the first round despite an average of 103.04; the highest winning average was 101.84, achieved by Michael van Gerwen in his victory over Lewy Williams. The first 170 "big fish" finish of the tournament was hit by Martin Schindler in his second round match against Martin Lukeman, the first to be hit by a German player in any PDC World Championship.

Third round
Reigning champion Peter Wright's title would come to an end in the third round, after a 4–1 defeat to Belgian Kim Huybrechts. Wright was one of three former World Champions to lose in the third round, as Raymond van Barneveld was eliminated 4–0 by fellow former champion Gerwyn Price, and Gary Anderson lost to Chris Dobey. Two unseeded players made their way through to the fourth round, Alan Soutar reaching the fourth round for the second consecutive year after a 4–2 win over Danny Noppert, and debutant Josh Rock beating Nathan Aspinall 4–3.

Van Gerwen set a new highest average of the tournament, averaging 107.66 in a 4–2 victory over Mensur Suljović. Michael Smith hit the second 170 checkout of the tournament, in a match that saw him come back from 3–1 down to triumph 4–3 over Schindler. The match between Van Duijvenbode and Ross Smith saw 31 maximum scores – the record for a best of 7 sets match – 19 of which were for Smith, equalling the record for an individual player in a best of 7 match. It was the first match of the tournament to go to a final sudden-death leg, which Van Duijvenbode won.

Fourth round

Two of the top six seeds were eliminated in the fourth round, former champion Rob Cross losing 4–2 to Dobey, and Luke Humphries being eliminated by Stephen Bunting after a 4–1 defeat. Dobey's win saw him throw one of two 170 finishes in the round, with the other being hit by Van Duijvenbode. Despite the big finish, Van Duijvenbode was eliminated after 4–1 defeat to Van Gerwen.

The runs of Rock and Soutar were both ended in this stage, Rock losing 4–3 to Jonny Clayton and Soutar falling 4–1 to Gabriel Clemens, with Clemens becoming the first ever German player to reach the quarter-final of a PDC World Darts Championship. Dimitri Van den Bergh beat Huybrechts 4–0 in an all Belgian affair, and Price and Michael Smith both triumphed 4–1 over José de Sousa and Joe Cullen respectively.

Quarter-finals
The quarter-finals were held on New Year's Day. The first to be played was between van den Bergh and Clayton. The first six sets of the match went with throw before van den Bergh took advantage of one missed dart for the seventh set from Clayton to break throw and take a lead which turned out to be decisive after van den Bergh won the eighth set for a 5–3 victory. This made van den Bergh the first Belgian player to qualify for a semi-final, having been eliminated at the quarter-final stage on two previous occasions.

The second quarter-final was between Smith and Bunting. The first two sets were shared before Smith went on a run of three consecutive set wins, only losing two legs over those three sets. Bunting fought back, taking the sixth and seventh set, before missed darts in the eighth set proved decisive, Smith taking it 3–1 and sealing a 5–3 triumph. Smith reached the semi-final for the second consecutive year and the third time overall.

In the third quarter-final, between Price and Clemens, Price took the first set comfortably, but Clemens levelled the match by winning the second set, and then broke Price's throw in the third leg of the third set, taking both that set and the next one 3–1 to hold a 3–1 set lead as the players left the stage for a TV advertising break. Price returned to the stage wearing a large set of ear defenders, and took the first leg comfortably after the break, but Clemens took back control of the match from there and won the next six legs to win 5–1 and continue his historic run for German darts. After the match, Price stated on Instagram that he was not sure he would play in the World Championship again.

The final quarter-final was between van Gerwen and Dobey, and the three-time champion van Gerwen comfortably defeated Dobey to emphasise his status as favourite for the tournament. Dobey only managed to take three legs in the entire match as Van Gerwen won 5–0 with an average of 102.39 to reach his eighth semi-final, and his first since the 2020 tournament.

Semi-finals

The semi-finals were held on 2 January, with Clemens playing Smith in the first to be played. The first four sets all went to last legs but were all holds of throw. Smith took the fifth set 3–0, before taking out a finish of 83 on the bullseye in the sixth set's deciding leg to break the Clemens throw for the first time. Smith held on to the seventh set in another deciding leg to go one set away. A break of the Clemens throw in the third leg gave Smith the lead in the eighth set which he held on to, to triumph 6–2 and qualify for his third world final, and second consecutive.

The second semi-final saw Van den Bergh take on Van Gerwen. Van den Bergh broke the throw in the first set by taking out a 170 finish in the third leg, but Van Gerwen immediately broke back and held the set, before breaking Van den Bergh twice in the second set to win it 3–0. Van Gerwen hit the match's second 170 finish in the second leg of the third set to break Van den Bergh's throw and completed the third set 3–0. Van den Bergh managed to take the fourth set to a final leg but Van Gerwen broke his throw yet again to take a 4–0 lead. Van Gerwen took another 3–0 victory in the fifth set, and took the sixth set by the same scoreline to win 6–0 and reach his sixth final, having only lost three sets in the tournament to that point. Van Gerwen's match average of 108.28 is the highest of the tournament so far.

Final
The final between Smith and van Gerwen, a repeat of the 2019 PDC World Darts Championship final, took place on 3 January. Smith threw first in the opening set, but lost his throw in the third leg after missing a dart for a 127 checkout, and Van Gerwen held throw in the next leg to take the first set. 

In the third leg of the second set, both players opened with 180s, with Van Gerwen following with a 177 while Smith recorded a second straight 180. Van Gerwen then hit the first two treble 20s but missed double 12 for a perfect nine-dart finish and Smith immediately hit treble 20 followed by treble 19 and double 12 to complete his own perfect leg. Smith became just the second player to record a nine-dart finish in a PDC World Championship final after Adrian Lewis became the first in 2011 against Gary Anderson. Broadcasters and sportswriters subsequently labeled the leg as the greatest in darting history, with factors including not just a nine-dart finish in a World Championship final but also 17 out of 18 perfect darts thrown by the two players combined.

Smith subsequently won the next leg to level the set score and also won the third set 3–2, but Van Gerwen levelled the match again with a 3–0 win in set four. Van Gerwen then won the deciding leg in the next set to regain the advantage, but a 3–1 win for Smith restored parity. Van Gerwen looked to be taking the seventh set after winning the first two legs, but Smith fought back and managed to win a deciding leg to go over the half way mark.

In the eighth set it was Smith's turn to take a two leg lead, and unlike the previous set the advantage was not surrendered, with Smith taking the set 3–1. With Van Gerwen now under huge pressure Smith took the ninth set 3–0 to go one away from the Championship. The tenth set went down to a last leg, which Van Gerwen managed to take to keep the match alive. Van Gerwen took the first two legs in the next set, but Smith fought back to set up a deciding leg for the Championship. Smith opened the deciding leg with two 180s and closed on double eight to become World Champion for the first time. The victory also moved Smith to top of the PDC Order of Merit for the first time.

Schedule
The schedule of play was confirmed on 30 November 2022. The first and second rounds took place from 15–23 December, when the tournament took a break for Christmas, before resuming on 27 December. The third and fourth rounds were scheduled from 27–30 December, with the quarter-final, semi-final and final stages occurring in January 2023.

Draw

The draw of the tournament was made by Wayne Mardle and Mark Webster live on Sky Sports News and streamed via YouTube on 28 November 2022.

Final

Finals

Top half

Section 1

Section 2

Bottom half

Section 3

Section 4

Statistics

Highest averages
This table shows all averages over 100 achieved by players throughout the tournament. In the case one player has multiple records, this is indicated by the number in brackets.

The three-dart average in darts is the average score achieved with three darts thrown. Averages are the most cited statistics in darts matches as they give a rough estimate of a player's form. An average of 100 is regarded as a benchmark for a world class performance. For comparison with previous years, see the highest ever recorded averages in the World Darts Championship.

Broadcasting rights
In the United Kingdom and Republic of Ireland, the event was broadcast by Sky Sports as part of a seven-year contract signed in 2017 with the PDC. Sky Sports' coverage was fronted by Emma Paton, who replaced Laura Woods in the role following her departure to ITV Sport earlier in 2022. Pundits for the event included former world champions John Part and Mark Webster, plus Wayne Mardle and Laura Turner. The championship was the first since the deaths of long-time Sky Sports commentators John Gwynne and Nigel Pearson. As part of a two-year contract extension signed in 2021, the tournament was also broadcast via radio station Talksport, with former players Paul Nicholson and Chris Mason among the commentary team.

In Netherlands, the tournament was aired on subscription streaming service Viaplay. German coverage was aired on Sport1, and achieved a record viewership for darts in Germany for Gabriel Clemens' semi-final.

Television

References

2023
World Championship
World Championship
2022 in British sport
2023 in British sport
2022 sports events in London
2023 sports events in London
International sports competitions in London
Alexandra Palace
December 2022 sports events in the United Kingdom
January 2023 sports events in the United Kingdom